Diego Rivas Rego (born 27 May 1987 in Narón, Galicia) is a Spanish professional footballer who plays for Racing de Ferrol as a goalkeeper.

Honours
Elche
Segunda División: 2012–13

Eibar
Segunda División: 2013–14

References

External links

1987 births
Living people
People from Narón
Sportspeople from the Province of A Coruña
Spanish footballers
Footballers from Galicia (Spain)
Association football goalkeepers
Segunda División players
Segunda División B players
Tercera División players
Primera Federación players
Deportivo Fabril players
CD Lugo players
Elche CF players
SD Eibar footballers
CD Tenerife players
Albacete Balompié players
CD Guijuelo footballers
Real Murcia players
Lleida Esportiu footballers
Racing de Ferrol footballers
New Zealand Football Championship players
Auckland City FC players
Spanish expatriate footballers
Expatriate association footballers in New Zealand
Spanish expatriate sportspeople in New Zealand